The D.I.C.E. Awards (formerly the Interactive Achievement Awards) is an award show in the video game industry started in 1998 and commonly referred to in the industry as the video game equivalent of the Academy Awards. The awards are arranged by the Academy of Interactive Arts & Sciences (AIAS) and held during the AIAS' annual D.I.C.E. Summit in Las Vegas. "D.I.C.E." is a backronym for "Design Innovate Communicate Entertain". The D.I.C.E. Awards recognize games, individuals, and development teams that have contributed to the advancement of the multi-billion dollar worldwide entertainment software industry.

Format
The nominees in each category are selected by a peer panel, assembled by AIAS, of over 100 video game professionals across several facets of the industry, including developers, programmers, artists, and publishers, which is published on the AIAS website each year. The nominees are then voted on by the full membership of AIAS (over 33,000 members) via a confidential and secured voting system, and winners are subsequently announced during the D.I.C.E. Summit in Las Vegas, typically the February of that year. Due to this approach, the D.I.C.E. awards are considered the main peer-based recognition within the video games compared to other major awards.

Award ceremonies

Award categories

Current categories

The first eight ceremonies separate awards for computer games and console games. Initially, there were separate awards for computer/console action, adventure, role-playing, sports, and later family games. Fighting and racing were exclusive console genre awards, and exclusive computer genres included strategy, simulation, creativity, and educational games. Adventure and role-playing awards were merged in 2000. The following year adventure would be merged with action, role-playing would be separate. Console and computer first-person action categories were introduced in 2003 along with Console Platform Action/Adventure Game of the Year. Separate awards for console action sports and console sports simulation would be offered in 2004. The category for sports simulation would be offered again 2005, before merging back into a single Sports Game of the Year. Platform-exclusive genre categories, such as fighting, racing, strategy, and simulation, would drop the console or computer title of the award in 2005. Console and computer categories would be merged in 2006. Platform Action/Adventure would not be featured in 2007, and featured just one Action/Adventure Game of the Year. The categories for First-Person Action Game of the Year and Action/Adventure Game of the Year would be replaced by Action Game of the Year and Adventure Game of the Year in 2008. That same year, categories for strategy and simulation games would be merged into one. In 2010, Role-Playing Game of the Year was merged with Massively Multiplayer Game of the Year, but Massively Multiplayer was dropped from the category title in 2018. In 2010, Handheld Game of the Year and Cellular Game of the Year were merged into Portable Game of the Year. Separate categories for handheld and mobile games would be offered again starting in 2012. Portable Game of the Year would be offered again in 2019, but was eventually replaced by Mobile Game of the Year in 2021. Multiple genre categories for Online games were offered in 1999, but they would not continue going forward. In 2001, Online Game of the Year was replaced by the Outstanding Achievement in Online Gameplay. Online Game of the Year would be offered again in 2014 and then again in 2018, and has been offered every year since. Initially, there were separate categories for male and female character performances, but were merged into a single category in 2008. The 2008 and 2009 awards offered separate outstanding achievement categories for an original story and an adapted story. The Outstanding Achievement in Story would return in 2010. In 2015, the outstanding achievement categories for gameplay engineering and visual engineering were combined into the Outstanding Technical Achievement. 2015 was also the first year to offer the D.I.C.E. Sprite Award, which was to recognize "a game having disproportionate resources for development and exposure (as compared to AAA titles)", to recognize smaller indie developers. This would later be replaced by Outstanding Achievement for an Independent Game.

Discontinued categories

Special categories

Hall of Fame 
The Academy of Interactive Arts & Sciences has annually inducted into its "Hall of Fame" video game developers that have made revolutionary and innovative achievements in the video game industry.

Lifetime Achievement Awards 
The Lifetime Achievement Award is given "for individuals whose accomplishments span a broad range of disciplines over a lengthy career in the industry".

Pioneer Awards 
The Pioneer Award is given "for individuals whose career spanning work has helped shape and define the interactive entertainment industry".

Technical Impact Award 
The Technical Impact Award was added for the 2015 awards ceremony to recognize "unique innovations that contribute to the ongoing progress of interactive media".

Notable highest wins and nominations

By game 

The following games received six or more D.I.C.E. Awards:

The following games received eleven or more D.I.C.E. Award nominations:

By franchise 

The following franchises received eleven or more D.I.C.E. Awards:

The following franchises received thirty or more D.I.C.E. Award nominations:

By developer

Most award-winning developers:

Most nominated developers:

By publisher

The most award-winning publishers:

The most nominated publishers.:

Notes

References 

 
Awards established in 1998